Igor Kravtsov (born 21 December 1973 in Magnitogorsk) is a Russian rower. He won a gold medal at the 2004 Summer Olympics.

External links 

1973 births
Russian male rowers
Rowers at the 1996 Summer Olympics
Rowers at the 2004 Summer Olympics
Olympic rowers of Russia
Medalists at the 2004 Summer Olympics
Olympic medalists in rowing
Olympic gold medalists for Russia
People from Magnitogorsk
Living people
Sportspeople from Chelyabinsk Oblast